John Woo's 7 Brothers is a 2006 five-issue comic book limited series published under the Director's Cut imprint of Virgin Comics. The series was produced by John Woo, written by Garth Ennis and illustrated by Jeevan Kang. In 2007, the series was followed by a sequel, John Woo's 7 Brothers II, written by Ben Raab and Deric Hughes, with art by Edison George.

Plot summary
Six hundred years ago, a mighty treasure fleet set out to sail the oceans of the world. They reached every continent, discovered every land long before history's great explorers stole the credit for their feats. Now, in modern-day Los Angeles, seven men with nothing in common but their destinies are drawn together in the service of a mysterious young woman. An ancient prophecy must be fulfilled. Something terrible is reaching out across the centuries. There's a world to be saved... and the only hope for us all is a motley crew of so-called brothers and a power too terrifying to be used.

Similar books
The graphic novel Seven Sons, by Alexander Grecian and Riley Rossmo and released through AiT/Planet Lar, was based on the same folktale about seven Chinese brothers with unique powers. The original title of Seven Sons was 7 Brothers, but it was changed to avoid confusion with the Woo/Ennis book.

Publications
Seven Brothers (by Garth Ennis and Jeevan Kang, based on a concept by John Woo, 5-issue mini-series, Virgin Comics, 2006, tpb, 144 pages, July 2007)

See also
Indian comics

References

External links
 Seven Brothers at Liquid Comics
 
 Review of issue #1, Comics Bulletin
 Garth Ennis on Seven Brothers

2006 comics debuts
Comics by Garth Ennis
Virgin Comics titles